De analysi per aequationes numero terminorum infinitas (or On analysis by infinite series, On Analysis by Equations with an infinite number of terms, or On the Analysis by means of equations of an infinite number of terms) is a mathematical work by Isaac Newton.

Creation

Composed in 1669, during the mid-part of that year probably, from ideas Newton had acquired during the period 1665–1666. Newton wrote

The explication was written to remedy apparent weaknesses in the logarithmic series [infinite series for ] , that had become republished due to Nicolaus Mercator, or through the encouragement of Isaac Barrow in 1669, to ascertain the knowing of the prior authorship of a general method of infinite series. The writing was circulated amongst scholars as a manuscript in 1669, including John Collins a mathematics intelligencer for a group of British and continental mathematicians. His relationship with Newton in the capacity of informant proved instrumental in securing Newton recognition and contact with John Wallis at the Royal Society.
Both Cambridge University Press and Royal Society rejected the treatise from publication, being instead published in London in 1711 by William Jones, and again in 1744, as Methodus fluxionum et serierum infinitarum cum eisudem applicatione ad curvarum geometriam in Opuscula mathematica, philosophica et philologica  by Marcum-Michaelem Bousquet at that time edited by Johann Castillioneus.

Content
The exponential series, i.e. tending toward infinity, was discovered by Newton and is contained within the Analysis. The treatise contains also the sine series and cosine series and arc series, the logarithmic series and the binomial series.

See also
 Newton's method

References

External links 
 Text of De analysi (Latin)
 - PDF version

Latin texts
Works by Isaac Newton
Infinity